Ernst von Steinberg (26 September 1692 – 3 October 1759) was a Hanoverian minister and head of the German Chancery in London from 1737 until 1748.

Life and career
He was the son of Georg von Steinberg and Eva von Korff. He married Marie Luise von Wendt in 1726 and replaced Johann Philipp von Hattorf as German Chancery head upon his death in 1737. He gained his position due to the influence of his cousin, Amalie von Wallmoden, the future Countess of Yarmouth, who was the mistress of George II.

He was politically conservative and rarely expressed his opinion to King George, acting instead as primarily a secretary. He did, however, participate in court life and was the first Hanoverian minister to be active in the British court. His successor, Philipp Adolph von Münchhausen, would follow in his footsteps.

Steinberg resigned his post in 1748 and returned to Hanover. He and his wife had a son, George August (born 18 May 1739), and a daughter, Eva.

References

Sources 
 Jeremy Black, George II: Puppet of the Politicians? (Exeter: UP, 2007), p. 162.

German Chancery
Politicians from Hanover
Barons of Germany
1692 births
1759 deaths